Alain Devaquet (4 October 1942 – 19 January 2018) was a French politician who was a minister under Jacques Chirac. A university professor before embarking on his political career with the Rally for the Republic, Devaquet was given the role of junior minister for universities. In this role he became the public face of a controversial proposal to reform the higher education system in 1986, the proposals becoming known as the Devaquet Law, despite originating from more senior members of the government. The plan allowed universities to be more selective in the admission of students and to charge fees.

The reaction against the proposals was strong, with mass protests by students and some strikes in support of their opposition. With the mobilisation of students also closely linked to other proposals aimed at tightening immigration laws, things came to a head with the death of Malik Oussekine, a student protester who died in police custody on 6 December 1986 and whose death prompted mass outpouring of anger. The law was withdrawn two days later and Devaquet was forced to resign, although the incident proved a strong blow to the government and enhanced the profile of François Mitterrand due to his opposition.

References

External links 
 Liberation article about him

1942 births
2018 deaths
People from Vosges (department)
Politicians from Grand Est
Rally for the Republic politicians
Government ministers of France
Deputies of the 6th National Assembly of the French Fifth Republic
Deputies of the 9th National Assembly of the French Fifth Republic
Deputies of the 10th National Assembly of the French Fifth Republic
ENS Fontenay-Saint-Cloud-Lyon alumni
Academic staff of École Polytechnique
Deaths from cancer in France